Brucht is a river of North Rhine-Westphalia, Germany. It flows into the Nethe near Brakel.

Brucht is also a hamlet in Overijssel, Netherlands, south of the town of Hardenberg. Coördinates: 51.7167, 9.1833.

See also
List of rivers of North Rhine-Westphalia

References

Rivers of North Rhine-Westphalia
Rivers of Germany